The Jatiya Party (Manju) (Bengali: জাতীয় পার্টি (মঞ্জু)) (National Party (Manju)) is a political party in Bangladesh, led by Anwar Hossain Manju. It is a splinter group of the original Jatiya Party, that was founded by the military dictator Hussain Mohammad Ershad. It broke away from the original Jatiya Party in the late 1990s when Hussain Mohammad Ershad joined the BNP and Jamaat to form the 4 party alliance. Both of its top leaders served as Ministers under HM Ershad.

The party is registered with the Election Commission of Bangladesh as Jatiya Party-JP.

References

Jatiya Party (Ershad)
Political parties in Bangladesh
Political parties with year of establishment missing